The 2017 Macedonian Basketball Cup was the 25th season of the Macedonian Basketball Cup. The Final Eight was held in the Jasmin Sports Hall in Kavadarci from 17 February until 19 February 2017. Karpoš Sokoli won its first cup in club history.

Bracket

References

Basketball in North Macedonia
basketball cup